Skultuna is a locality situated in Västerås Municipality, Västmanland County, Sweden with 3,133 inhabitants in 2010.

Skultuna has some of Sweden's oldest industrial sites (including an early 17th-century brassworks, Skultuna Messingsbruk) as well as two runestones.

Skultuna was also the birthplace of:
 Julia Nyberg (1784-1854), author and songwriter 
 Esbjörn Svensson (1964-2008), pianist, composer, and band leader
 Magnus Öström (born 3 May 1965), drummer, composer, and band leader. Svennson and Öström were childhood friends who formed their first band in Skultuna.

References

External links

Populated places in Västmanland County
Populated places in Västerås Municipality